Mkoani District (Wilaya ya Mkoani in Swahili)  is one of two administrative districts of Pemba South Region in Tanzania. The district is comparable in size to the land area of Niue. The district has a water border to the east, south and west by the Indian Ocean. The district is bordered to the north by Chake Chake District. The district seat (capital) is the town of Mkoani. According to the 2012 census, the district has a total population of 97,867.

Administrative subdivisions
As of 2012, Mkoani District was administratively divided into 32 wards.

Wards

 Chambani
 Changaweni
 Chokocho
 Chumbageni
 Jombwe
 Kendwa
 Kengeja
 Kisiwa Panza
 Kiwani
 Kuukuu

 Makombeni
 Makoongwe
 Mbuguani
 Mbuyuni
 Mgagadu
 Michenzani
 Minazini
 Mizingani
 Mjimbini
 Mkanyageni

 Mkungu
 Mtambile
 Mtangani
 Muambe
 Ng'ombeni
 Ngwachani
 Shamiani
 Shidi
 Stahabu
 Ukutini
 Uweleni
 Wambaa

References

Pemba South Region